LaVal's myotis (Myotis lavali) is a species of bat found in Brazil and Paraguay.

Taxonomy
This species was described from the Myotis nigricans complex in 2011, based on museum collections from 3 localities in northeastern Brazil. Later on, additional studies confirmed Myotis lavali as a species, and highlight the co-occurrence with M. nigricans in several locations.

Range and habitat
This species was recorded in the Brazilian states of Pernambuco, Bahia, Piauí, Ceará and the north-eastern and south-western parts of Paraguay.
Specimens were observed in different ecosystems such as deciduous forests, Cerrado, Caatinga and Gran Chaco, up to 900 meters of altitude.

References

Literature cited

Moratelli, R., Peracchi, A. L., Dias, D., & de Oliveira, J. A. 2011.Geographic variation in South American populations of Myotis nigricans (Chiroptera, Vespertilionidae), with the description of two new species. Mammalian Biology - Zeitschrift für Säugetierkunde, 76(5), 592-607.
 Moratelli, R., & Wilson, D. E. 2013. Distribution and natural history of Myotis lavali (Chiroptera, Vespertilionidae). Journal of Mammalogy, 94(3), 650-656.

Mouse-eared bats
Mammals described in 2011
Bats of South America